The following is a list of episodes for the Australian television programme, Crownies.

, 22 original episodes of Crownies have aired.

Series overview

Episodes

Season 1 (2011)

References

External links
 List of episodes at abc.net.au
 

Lists of Australian drama television series episodes